Kranti Veera is a 1972 Indian Kannada-language action drama film directed and produced by R. Ramamurthy. It stars Rajkumar, Rajesh and Jayanthi. The film's story was written by R. Rangarajan and Satyam was the soundtrack and score composer. The dialogues and lyrics were written by Chi. Udaya Shankar. The film is a classic case of visual representation of political transition from monarchy to democracy. The film reminds of princely India which existed in colonial India. The film acquires its political tone thanks to its theme which remind us of political history of Mysore and other princely states of Karnataka.

Cast

Soundtrack 
The music of the film was composed by Satyam and lyrics for the soundtrack written by Chi. Udaya Shankar.

Track list

See also
 Kannada films of 1972

References

External links 
 

1972 films
1970s Kannada-language films
Indian black-and-white films
Indian action films
Films scored by Satyam (composer)
1972 action films
Films directed by R. Ramamurthy